From Her to Eternity is the debut studio album by Nick Cave and the Bad Seeds, released in May 1984 on Mute. Produced by Flood and the band itself, the album's title is a pun on the James Jones novel, From Here to Eternity, and its subsequent 1953 film adaptation.

Background and production
After the breakup of Nick Cave's former band The Birthday Party, Cave formed a new project with former band member Mick Harvey. Cave and Harvey were joined by a semi-fluid group of bandmates, initially including Einstürzende Neubauten member Blixa Bargeld on guitar, Hugo Race on guitar, and former Magazine member Barry Adamson on guitar, bass, and piano. After some studio work, the band's premiere public performance was held on New Year's Eve, 1983 at the Crystal Ballroom in Melbourne, under the name "Nick Cave – Man Or Myth?", followed by a tour. The band then briefly called themselves "Nick Cave and the Cavemen" before adopting the "Bad Seeds" moniker, in reference to the final Birthday Party release, The Bad Seed EP.

The majority of the album was recorded at Trident Studios in London in March 1984. "Saint Huck", "Wings off Flies" and "A Box for Black Paul" were recorded at The Garden studio (owned by John Foxx) between September and October 1983. J.G. Thirlwell, an early member of the group, co-wrote "Wings Off Flies" and made uncredited instrumental contributions to the album, but departed early in the recording sessions due to creative disagreements and to work on his own solo material. The band is also seen playing a live performance of the title track in the 1987 Wim Wenders film Wings of Desire. This version, recorded at Hansa Studio, Berlin in February 1987, is included on CD reissues of the album.

Cave later said, "Well, I guess we weren't kicking people in the teeth anymore. I mean, it just became different. I wanted it to be more lyrically orientated and getting Blixa Bargeld from Einstürzende Neubauten in the group made an incredible difference. He's a completely kind of atmospheric guitarist and incredibly economical and it gave me room to breathe."

Critical reception

From Her to Eternity has been well received by critics. Trouser Press wrote that while "the album relies less on shock effects than any the Birthday Party ever made, the explosive parts are that much more effective." Chris Long of BBC Music described it as "imperfect, visceral, exciting and, ultimately, classic."

Mat Snow said it was, "one of the greatest rock albums ever made. Dynamic, subtly layered, funny and plain obsessive, From Her To Eternity is the work of a visionary unfettered by worship of the romantic rock'n'roll mythology, and which thus reaches peaks hitherto unscaled."

Pitchfork ranked it 63rd on their list "The 200 Best Albums of the 1980s", calling it "ghoulish to the point of ridiculousness, which is the entire point [...their] visceral hyperbole is something powerful, as though we’re hearing humankind’s palm read by a fortune teller with a cockeyed grin and a hand snatching your wallet."

2009 remaster
The album was remastered and reissued on 27 April 2009 as a collector's edition CD/DVD set, along with the three subsequent albums in the Bad Seeds catalog, namely The Firstborn Is Dead, Kicking Against the Pricks and Your Funeral... My Trial. The CD features the original 7-song vinyl LP's track listing, while "In the Ghetto", "The Moon Is in the Gutter", and "From Her to Eternity" (1987 version) are featured as bonus audio tracks on the accompanying DVD, rather than being sequenced into the album as in earlier CD pressings. The DVD also includes music videos from the time and the first installment of 'Do You Love Me Like I Love You', a 14-part documentary by Iain Forsyth and Jane Pollard.

Track listing

Personnel
All personnel credits adapted from From Her to Eternitys album notes, unless otherwise noted.

Nick Cave and the Bad Seeds
Nick Cave - lead vocals, Hammond organ
Barry Adamson - bass, backing vocals
Blixa Bargeld - guitar, slide guitar, backing vocals
Mick Harvey - drums, piano, guitar, vibraphone, organ, backing vocals
Anita Lane (credited as bandmember, but does not perform on the album)
Hugo Race - guitar, backing vocals
J.G. Thirlwell (uncredited)

Technical personnel
Flood – engineering
Tim Tom – LP mastering

Design personnel
Marina – front cover photography
Jessamy Calkin – back cover photography

2009 Collector's Edition Remaster personnel
Mick Harvey – executive production, 5.1 surround sound mixing
David Rowntree – executive production
Rachel Willis – executive production
Shaun Connon – executive production
Kevin Van Bergen – master-tape transfer
Kevin Paul – 5.1 surround sound mixing
Simon Heyworth – remastering
Amy Hanson – sleeve notes
Anne Carruthers – co-ordination
MJ Salisbury – co-ordination

Chart positions

References

External links
 at Nick Caves official website

1984 debut albums
Mute Records albums
Nick Cave albums
Albums recorded at Trident Studios